Jews in New York City comprise approximately 9 percent of the city's population, making the Jewish community the largest in the world outside of Israel.  , 1.1 million Jews lived in the five boroughs of New York City, and over 1.75 million Jews lived in New York State overall.

Judaism is the second-largest religion practiced in New York City, with approximately 1.6 million adherents as of 2022, representing the largest Jewish community of any city in the world, greater than the combined totals of Tel Aviv and Jerusalem. Nearly half of the city’s Jews live in Brooklyn. The ethno-religious population makes up 18.4% of the city and its religious demographic makes up 8%. The first recorded Jewish settler was Jacob Barsimson, who arrived in August 1654 on a passport from the Dutch West India Company. Following the assassination of Alexander II of Russia, for which many blamed "the Jews", the 36 years beginning in 1881 experienced the largest wave of Jewish immigration to the United States. In 2012, the largest Jewish denominations were Orthodox, Haredi, and Conservative Judaism. Reform Jewish communities are prevalent through the area. Central Synagogue in Manhattan is the largest Reform synagogue in the world. Jews have immigrated to New York City since the first settlement in Dutch New Amsterdam in 1654, most notably at the end of the 19th century to the early 20th century, when the Jewish population rose from about 80,000 in 1880 to 1.5 million in 1920. The large Jewish population has led to a significant impact on the culture of New York City. After many decades of decline in the 20th century, the Jewish population of New York City has seen a sharp increase in the 21st century, owing to the high birth rate of the Hasidic and Orthodox communities.

Population

, about 1.6 million residents of New York City, or about 18% of its residents, were Jewish.

There are over 2 million Jews in the New York metropolitan area, making it the second largest metropolitan Jewish community in the world, after the Tel Aviv Metropolitan Area in Israel (however, Tel Aviv proper has a smaller population of Jews than New York City proper, making New York City the largest community of Jews in the world within a city proper). New York City's Jewish population is more than the combined Jewish populations of Chicago, Philadelphia, San Francisco, and Washington, D.C., and more than Jerusalem and Tel Aviv combined.

The number of Jews in New York City soared throughout the beginning of the 20th century and reached a peak of 2 million in the 1950s, when Jews constituted one-quarter of the city's population. New York City's Jewish population then began to decline because of low fertility rates and migration to suburbs and other states, particularly California and Florida. Though there were small Jewish communities throughout the United States by the 1920s, New York City was home to about 45% of the entire population of American Jews. A new wave of Ashkenazi and Bukharian Jewish immigrants from the former Soviet Union began arriving in the 1980s and 1990s. Sephardic Jews, including Syrian Jews, have also lived in New York City since the late 19th century. Russian, Lithuanian, and Polish Jews immigrated during the mid-19th century as well, in large numbers. There have also been a sizeable amount of Mountain Jews from Azerbaijan and the South Caucasus in Brooklyn as well as Bukharian Jews from Uzbekistan and greater Central Asia in Forest Hills, Queens. Many Jews, including the newer immigrants, have settled in Queens, south Brooklyn, and the Bronx, where at present most live in middle-class neighborhoods. The number of Jews is especially high in Brooklyn, where 561,000 residents—one out of four inhabitants—is Jewish. , there are 1.1 million Jews in New York City. Borough Park, known for its large Orthodox Jewish population, had 27.9 births per 1,000 residents in 2015, making it the neighborhood with the city's highest birth rate. However, the most rapidly growing community of American Orthodox Jews is located in Rockland County and the Hudson Valley of New York, including the communities of Monsey, Monroe, New Square, Kiryas Joel, and Ramapo. Within the greater New York metropolitan area, many rapidly growing Orthodox Jewish communities have made their home in New Jersey, particularly in Lakewood and surrounding Ocean County, where Beth Medrash Govoha, the world's largest yeshiva outside Israel, is located.

In 2002, an estimated 972,000 Ashkenazi Jews lived in New York City and constituted about 12% of the city's population. New York City is also home to the world headquarters of the  Chabad, Bobover, and Satmar branches of Hasidism, and other Haredi branches of Judaism. While three-quarters of New York Jews do not consider themselves religiously observant, the Orthodox community is rapidly growing due to the high birth rates of Hasidic Jews, while the numbers of Conservative and Reform Jews are declining.

Organizations such as The Agudath Israel of America, The Orthodox Union, Chabad, and The Rohr Jewish Learning Institute have their headquarters in New York.

While the majority of Jews in New York City are white, some Jewish New Yorkers identify as Asian, Black, Latino, or multiracial. According to a 2011 community study conducted by the UJA-Federation of New York, 12% of Jewish households in the city are non-white or biracial.

Many Sephardi immigrants have settled in New York City and formed a Sephardi community. The community is centered in Brooklyn and is primarily composed of Syrian Jews. Other Sephardi Jews in New York City hail from Egypt, Israel, Lebanon, and Morocco. Sephardi Jews first began arriving in New York City in large numbers between 1880 and 1924. Most Arab immigrants during these years were Christian, while Sephardi Jews were a minority and Arab Muslims largely began migrating during the mid-1960s. When Syrian Jews first began to arrive in New York City during the late 1800s and early 1900s, Eastern European Ashkenazi Jews on the Lower East Side sometimes disdained their Syrian co-coreligionists as Arabische Yidden, Arab Jews. Some Ashkenazim doubted whether Sephardi/Mizrahi Jews from the Middle East were Jewish at all. In response, some Syrian Jews who were deeply proud of their ancient Jewish heritage, derogatorily dubbed Ashkenazi Jews as "J-Dubs", a reference to the first and third letters of the English word "Jew". In the 1990 United States Census, there were 11,610 Sephardi Jews in New York City, comprising 23 percent of the total "Arab population" of the city. Arab Jews in the city sometimes still face anti-Arab racism. After the September 11 attacks, some Arab Jews in New York City were subjected to arrest and detention because they were suspected to be Islamist terrorists. Egyptian Jews arrived in New York City more recently than the Syrian Jews, with many of the Egyptian Jews speaking Ladino as well as Arabic and French. The vast majority Egyptian-Jewish immigrants to the city are Sephardi/Mizrahi, with very few being Ashkenazi. Ladino-speaking Egyptian Jews have tended to settle in the Forest Hills neighborhood of Queens. Very few Egyptian Jews lived in New York City or elsewhere in the United States prior to the 1956 Suez Crisis. Prior to the Immigration and Nationality Act of 1965, the quota for Egyptian immigrants was set at 100 people per year. Because of antisemitism directed against Egyptian Jews in Egypt, a small number of Egyptian-American Jews in New York City banded together as the "American Jewish Organization for the
Middle East, Inc." to advocate for Jewish Egyptian refugees. There are two major communities of Egyptian Jews, one in Queens and another in Brooklyn. Egyptian Jews in Queens helped found Shearith Israel Congregation, while Egyptian Jews in Brooklyn's Bensonhurst neighborhood largely attended Syrian-Jewish synagogues.

Many Central Asian Jews, predominantly Bukharian Jews from Uzbekistan, have settled in the Queens neighborhoods of Rego Park, Forest Hills, Kew Gardens, and Briarwood. As of 2001, an estimated 50,000 Bukharian Jews resided in Queens. Queens is also home to a large Georgian-American community of about 5,000, around 3,000 of whom are Georgian Jews. Queens has the third largest population of Georgian Jews in the world after Israel and Georgia. Forest Hills is home to the Congregation of Georgian Jews, the only Georgian-Jewish synagogue in the United States.

History

1654–1881

The first recorded Jewish settler in New York was Jacob Barsimson, who arrived in August 1654 on a passport from the Dutch West India Company. A month later, a group of Jews came to New York, then the colony New Amsterdam, as refugees from Recife, Brazil. Portugal had just re-conquered Dutch Brazil (what is now known of the Brazilian State of Pernambuco) from the Netherlands, and the Sephardi Jews there promptly fled. Most went to Amsterdam, but 23 headed for New Amsterdam instead. Governor Peter Stuyvesant was at first unwilling to accept them but succumbed to pressure from the Dutch West India Company—itself pressed by Jewish stockholders—to let them remain. Nevertheless, he imposed numerous restrictions and taxes on his Jewish subjects. Eventually, many of these Jews left.

When the British took the colony from the Dutch in 1664, the only Jewish name on the requisite oath of loyalty given to residents was Asser Levy. This is the only record of a Jewish presence at the time, until 1680 when some of Levy's relatives arrived from Amsterdam shortly before he died.

The first synagogue, the Sephardi Congregation Shearith Israel, was established in 1682, but it did not get its own building until 1730. Over time, the synagogue became dominant in Jewish life, organizing social services and mandating affiliation for all New York Jews. Even though by 1720 the Ashkenazim outnumbered Sephardim, the Sephardi customs were retained.

An influx of German and Polish Jews followed the Napoleonic Wars in Europe. The increasing number of Ashkenazim led to the founding of the city's second synagogue, B'nai Jeshurun, in 1825. The late arrival of synagogues can be attributed to a lack of rabbis. Those who were interested in training as a Rabbi could not do so in America before this part of the century. Several other synagogues followed B'nai Jeshurun in rapid succession, including the first Polish one, Congregation Shaare Zedek, in 1839. In 1845, the first Reform temple, Congregation Emanu-El of New York opened. New York City would later become host to several seminaries of various denominations, where rabbis could be ordained, by the 1920s.

By this time numerous communal aid societies were formed. These were usually quite small, and a single synagogue might be associated with more than a few such organizations. Two of the most important of these merged in 1859 to form the Hebrew Benevolent and Orphan Asylum Society (Jewish orphanages were constructed on 77th Street near 3rd Avenue and another in Brooklyn). In 1852 the "Jews' Hospital" (renamed in 1871 Mount Sinai Hospital), which would one day be considered one of the best in the country, was established.

Jewish days schools began to appear in the 19th century across the United States, the first being the Polonies Talmud Torah in 1821.

1881–1945

The 36 years beginning in 1881 experienced the largest wave of immigration to the United States ever. Following the assassination of Alexander II of Russia, for which many blamed "the Jews," there was a vast increase in anti-Jewish pogroms there – possibly with the support of the government – and numerous anti-Jewish laws were passed. The result was that over 2 million Jews immigrated to the United States, more than a million of them to New York.

Eastern Ashkenazi Jews and their culture flourished at this time. There was influx emigration from countries such as Lithuania, Poland, and Russia. Their congregations and businesses – namely shops selling Old World goods – firmly maintained their identity, language, and customs.

New York was the publishing city of the Yiddish newspaper, Forverts, first published in 1897. Several other Jewish newspapers followed and were being produced in common Jewish languages, such as Ladino, Yiddish, and Hebrew.

These immigrants tended to be young and relatively irreligious, and were generally skilled – especially in the clothing industry, which would soon dominate New York's economy. By the end of the nineteenth century, Jews "dominated related fields such as the fur trade."

The German Jews, who were often wealthy by this time, did not much appreciate the eastern Ashkenazi arrivals, and moved to uptown Manhattan en masse, away from the Lower East Side where most of the immigrants settled. Still, many of these Eastern European immigrants worked in factories owned by 'uptown' German Jews.

1945–1999

New York City teachers' strike of 1968

Crown Heights riot of 1991

New York City parks relating to Jewish culture
Within the New York City Department of Parks and Recreation, there are many parks that are either named after Jews, or containing monuments relating to their culture and history.

Manhattan

 Abe Lebewohl Park
 Asser Levy Recreation Center
 Baruch Playground
 Bella Abzug Park
 Gustave Hartman Triangle
 Jacob H. Schiff Playground
 Schiff Malls
 Jacob Joseph Playground
 Jacob K Javits Playground
 Montefiore Park
 Nathan Straus Playground
 Straus Park
 Straus Square
 Peretz Square
 Sidney Hillman Playground
 Sol Bloom Playground
 Sol Lain Playground
 Sophie Irene Loeb Playground
 Stanley Isaacs Playground
 Vladeck Park
 American Memorial to Six Million Jews of Europe (Riverside Park)
 Charles and Murray Gordon memorial (Fort Washington Park)
 Emma Lazarus Memorial Plaque (Battery Park)
 Jerusalem Grove (Battery Park)
 The Immigrants Sculpture (Battery Park)
 Gertrude Stein monument (Bryant Park)
 Jewish Tercentenary Monument (Peter Minuit Plaza)
 Loeb Memorial Fountain (Central Park)
 Schiff Fountain (Seward Park)

Bronx

 Ben Abrams Playground
 Benjamin Gladstone Square
 Hank Greenberg Ballfield
 Heinrich Heine Fountain (Joyce Kilmer Park)
 Keltch Park
 Netanyahu Memorial (Pelham Parkway)

Brooklyn

 Alben Triangle
 Asser Levy Park
 Babi Yar Triangle
 Colonel David Marcus Playground
 Harold W. Cohn Memorial Square
 Kolbert Playground
 Harry Maze Playground
 Holocaust Memorial Park
 Jacob Joffe Field
 Kaiser Park
 Lew Fidler Park
 Rapaport Playground
 Sobel Green
 Zion Triangle

Queens

 Cardozo Playground
 Federoff Triangle
 Gwirtzman Triangle
 Haym Salomon Square
 Ilse Metzger Sitting Area (Flushing Meadows-Corona Park)
 Sobelsohn Playground
 Rabbi Kirshblum Triangle
 Wallenberg Square
 Job Sculpture (Forest Park)
 Theodor Herzl Memorial (Freedom Square)
 Yitzchak Rabin Walk (Flushing Meadows-Corona Park)

Staten Island
 Levy Playground

See also

Black Jews in New York City
History of the Jews in New York
American Jews
Demographics of New York City
Jews in Philadelphia
History of the Jews in New York
List of Orthodox Jewish communities in the United States
History of Jews in the United States
Yonah Schimmel's Knish Bakery

References

Further reading
 Deborah Dash Moore, City of Promises: A History of the Jews of New York. In Three Volumes. New York: New York University Press, 2012.

External links

The Jewish Museum, New York City
Museum of Jewish Heritage
History of Jews in New York
Jewish Heritage Tours of New York City

Jewish
New York City